"I Don't Want to Wait" is a song written, recorded, and produced by American singer-songwriter Paula Cole. Cole wrote the song in mid-1996 and released it as second single from her second studio album, This Fire (1996), on October 14, 1997. The single release was successful, reaching  11 in the United States and No. 5 in Canada. VH1 ranked "I Don't Want to Wait" as one of the 100 Greatest Songs of the '90s at No. 81. The song later served as the opening theme for the American teen drama television series Dawson's Creek, which ran from 1998 to 2003.

Composition
Cole wrote "I Don't Want to Wait" at her spinet piano in her apartment in New York City during mid-1996. Described by Cole as "a very personal song" she wrote the song when she realized that her grandfather was near the end of his life. The song is about him and his wife, and specifically the relationship between their life and Cole's who realized "I don't want to make some of these mistakes. I really hope I don't"   Cole has described the central question of the chorus as "Do you say yes to life? Do you embrace the things that give you joy? Or do you cower back in fear or by culture's machinations keeping you small?"

"I Don't Want to Wait" is in common time with a moderate beat rate of 87 beats per minute, written in the key of G major. Cole originally composed the song in F-sharp major, but when the songbook for the album was prepared, the song was notated in G major. According to Cole, "most sales [...] are to beginners and intermediate musicians", so the publishers opted against the original key.

Music video
The music video for the song was directed by Mark Seliger and Fred Woodward. It was one of Cole's first videos, and was based on the concept of a woman who was immortal and had lovers in different time periods, all of whom died. The cut of the video was originally in chronological order, but for unknown reasons, a cut that was out of order was more frequently aired which led to the directors taking their name off the video, replacing it with the common moniker Alan Smithee.

Track listings
US 7-inch single
A. "I Don't Want to Wait" (edit) – 4:07
B. "Hitler's Brothers" (album version) – 3:35

UK and Australian CD single
 "I Don't Want to Wait" (edit)
 "Bethlehem"
 "Hitler's Brothers"

UK cassette single and German CD single
 "I Don't Want to Wait" (edit)
 "Bethlehem"

Chart performance
On the US Billboard Hot 100, "I Don't Want to Wait" spent the most consecutive weeks in the top 50 without cracking the top 10, peaking at No. 11. The single ranked at No. 10 on the Hot 100 year-end chart for 1998. In Canada, it is Cole's highest-charting single, peaking at No. 5 on the RPM Top Singles chart, and it also reached No. 27 in Australia and No. 43 in the United Kingdom.

Weekly charts

Year-end charts

Release history

In popular culture
Screenwriter Kevin Willamson became a fan of Cole's and used "I Don't Want to Wait"  as a theme song to his teen drama series Dawson's Creek after being unable to secure the licensing for Alanis Morissette's "Hand in My Pocket". At the time the use of a pre-existing work for a TV show theme, rather than the commissioning of a new song, was novel. The song became sufficiently identified with Dawson's Creek that it was used in parodies of the show, as featured in the film Scary Movie and the "Peterotica" episode of  Family Guy.

References

External links
Behind the Song: The Nine Lives of Paula Cole's "I Don't Want to Wait" by American Songwriter

1996 songs
1997 singles
Dawson's Creek
Imago Records singles
Paula Cole songs
Television drama theme songs
Warner Records singles
Songs written by Paula Cole